Ralph Albert Gilman (March 25, 1916 – October 5, 1955) was an American competition swimmer who represented the United States in the 1936 Summer Olympics in Berlin, Germany.  Gilman swam for the silver medal-winning U.S. team in the first round of the men's 4×200-meter freestyle relay.  He did not receive a medal, however, because only those relay swimmers who competed in the event final were medal-eligible under the 1936 Olympic swimming rules.

Gilman was the younger brother of 1928 Olympic swimmer Marian Gilman.

See also
 List of Ohio State University people

References

External links
 

1916 births
1955 deaths
American male freestyle swimmers
Olympic swimmers of the United States
Swimmers from Berkeley, California
Swimmers at the 1936 Summer Olympics
20th-century American people